Svitlana Prystav is a Ukrainian former pair skater. Competing with Viacheslav Tkachenko for the Soviet Union, she became a three-time World Junior medalist in the early 1990s. Later in their career, the pair represented Ukraine. They appeared at three senior-level ISU Championships, placing 10th at the 1993 European Championships in Helsinki (Finland), 13th at the 1993 World Championships in Prague (Czech Republic), and 14th at the 1994 European Championships in Copenhagen (Denmark).

Results  
(with Tkachenko)

References 

Ukrainian female pair skaters
Soviet female pair skaters
Living people
World Junior Figure Skating Championships medalists
Year of birth missing (living people)